Nick Holder (born 1969) is an underground hip-hop and house music deejay and producer from Toronto, Ontario.

Holder began DJing in the early 1980s, and soon became influenced by the Detroit techno scene and DJs such as Derrick May and Carl Craig.
He owns records labels DNH Records (house) and Treehouse Records (hip-hop), and has been producing music since 1991. In this period he has produced over 60 records. He has also produced music for labels like: Studio !K7 where he produced 2 albums '[One Night In The Disco and Still On Track, Jinxx records, Poker flat recordings, Stickman records, Ministry of Sound, Peppermint Jam, Definitive recordings, and NRK Sound Division. Holder's recording work spans house sounds through to disco loops and minimal Chicago style. Holder's single Da Sambafrique propelled him to cult producer status, a Latin track played by DJs all over the world. This record was to set the precedent for Holder's critically acclaimed album on NRK Sound Division, From Within and spawned two underground classics; Trying To Find Myself and I Once Believed In U.

Discography

AlbumsOne Night in the Disco (1997) Studio !K7Still On Track (1998) Studio !K7From Within (1999) NRK recordingsUnderground Alternatives (2000) NRK recordingsDeep in the Underground: 1994-2000 (2001) Hot JWPThe Other Side (2003) NRK recordingsThe Other Mixes (2004) NRK recordingsOther Mixes & The Other Side (2005) Open/MosrNrk Singles Vol.9: Mixed By Nick Holder (2008) NRK recordingsBlack Jazz (2008) DNH Records

Holder has also contributed to numerous compilation albums, including Latin House, and contributed eight of the thirteen tracks on the 1997 Best of DNH retrospective.

Singles
"Don't Go Away" (1996) Studio !K7
"Da Sambafrique" (1999) Studio !K7Trying To Find Myself: Remixes (1999)Hustlers Vol 2 (2000)Alternative Remixes Vol.1 (2001) NRK RecordingsAlternative Mixes vol. 2 (2001) NRK Recordings
"Summer Daze" (2001)On My Mind: Ian Pooley Mixes (2003) NRK RecordingsThe Other Mixes vol. 2 (2004)No More Dating DJ's (2004) NRK RecordingsErotic Illusions of a Totnes G'' EP (2006) Poker Flat Recordings
"Sometimes I'm Blue" Studio !K7
"Time I Spent in Torbay" (2008) NRK feat. Sasha

References

External links
Personal website at Myspace
Hogwood, Ben (2004) review of Nick Holder: The Other Mixes
Nick Holder at discogs.com

1969 births
Canadian DJs
Living people
Club DJs
Musicians from Toronto
Canadian dance musicians
Canadian electronic musicians
Remixers
Place of birth missing (living people)
Electronic dance music DJs